Where in America's Past Is Carmen Sandiego? is the 5th educational video game in the Carmen Sandiego series. It was produced by Broderbund and released in 1991.

Gameplay
The game includes 45 geographic locations, and 9 different historical eras to travel to. This far outweighs the number of travel destinations in the 1985 Where in the World Is Carmen Sandiego? game. Carmen and her henchmen are involved with some of American history's most iconic moments, including the signing of the Declaration of Independence.

Development
The scenery for the locations came from photographs that were digitized and pixelated.

Reception

PC Magazine said the game "offers complexities of plot and graphics that make the original Where in the World is Carmen Sandiego seem almost bland by comparison". It said the game "won't disappoint adventure hungry Carmen fans" and that "as edutainment, this game is fun and challenging". Compute! named it a "Compute Choice", calling the game's VGA graphics "stunning". The magazine concluded that "Where in the Past is Carmen Sandiego? is a must-have package for anyone interested in superior and engaging entertainment software". Computer Gaming World liked the game, but stated that it would become boring to older children and adults, and that it seemed designed to teach rudimentary facts about the chronology of American history as opposed to details. The reviewer was hopeful, however, that Where in America's Past would encourage students to study history on their own.

References

External links
 

1991 video games
Apple II games
Carmen Sandiego games
Detective video games
DOS games
Classic Mac OS games
Single-player video games
Video games set in the United States